Alpha Airport is located  west of the township of Alpha in Queensland, Australia.

See also
List of airports in Queensland

References

Airports in Queensland